Nathaniel Wayne, Jr. (born January 12, 1975 in Chicago, Illinois) is a former American football linebacker in the National Football League.  He played college football at the University of Mississippi (Ole Miss.)  He graduated with a degree in criminal justice. He was known as "Mr. Monday Night," as he consistently performed well on Monday Night Football.

Professional career
Wayne was drafted with 219th selection in the 1998 NFL Draft.  He played one game for the Denver Broncos in 1998, when they won their second straight Super Bowl.  He played a slightly larger role on the team in 1999, but was mainly a special teamer.  He signed with the Green Bay Packers and play with them as a starter and major contributor to the defense for three years, recording 298 tackles, ten sacks, six interceptions, five forced fumbles and five fumble recoveries, and 23 passes defensed.

Wayne signed a four-year deal with the Philadelphia Eagles on March 14, 2003.  He started in 2003, but was limited to playing on nickel  packages in 2004, due to the promotion of Jeremiah Trotter, and movement of Mark Simoneau to weakside linebacker.  Even then he lost playing time to Keith Adams.  Wayne was the first Eagle released in the 2005 off-season, and signed with the Lions later that year.

Personal life
Wayne has a wife, Tamiko, and three children.  He also owns a Coldstone Creamery in Atlantic Station in Atlanta, Georgia where he currently resides.  He is also a devout Jehovah’s Witness.

References

1975 births
Living people
American football outside linebackers
Ole Miss Rebels football players
Denver Broncos players
Green Bay Packers players
Philadelphia Eagles players
Jacksonville Jaguars players
Detroit Lions players